Charles H. Snowden (October 4, 1922 – July 22, 1997) was an American judge and politician. He served as a Democratic member for the 108th district of the Florida House of Representatives.

Life and career 
Snowden was a municipal judge.

In 1972, Snowden was elected to represent the 108th district of the Florida House of Representatives, succeeding Marshall Harris. He served until 1974, when he was succeeded by John Hill.

Snowden died in July 1997, at the age of 74.

References 

1922 births
1997 deaths
Democratic Party members of the Florida House of Representatives
20th-century American politicians
Florida state court judges
20th-century American judges